is a prequel visual novel of the fighting game series BlazBlue by Arc System Works. It was released in Japan for the PlayStation 3 and PlayStation Vita on July 23, 2013 and North America on June 24, 2014 by Aksys Games. The  Microsoft Windows's version was released worldwide on March 1, 2016. A sequel titled XBlaze Lost: Memories has been released for the PS3 and Vita in 2015 and on Windows in 2016.

Synopsis
The protagonist, Touya Kagari, is a resident of Shin Yokozaki City and a sophomore at the prestigious Hakuou North Academy. An earnest and responsible young man, Touya appears to be no more than your average high school student. While returning from his part-time job, he heard a mysterious sound coming from the depths of the Restricted Ward, an area off-limits to unauthorized personnel due to a horrible disaster that happened there ten years ago.

His curiosity having gotten the best of him, Touya ventured ever deeper into the ruins of the ward, eventually coming across a man who appeared to be gravely injured. Concerned, Touya rushed to his side, asking if he was okay and if he needed any help. But as Touya approached, the man suddenly stood up and attacked, screaming, “You’re an enemy!” And in the midst of invisible ringing bells, psychotic strangers, exploding walls of flame, and almost certain death, a small, cute girl with an enormous sword came charging in.

And despite her frilly, fragile appearance, her battle prowess was beyond reason or doubt. The name of Touya’s savior was Es, a soldier belonging to the Mitsurugi Agency.
Seithr, Drives, Unions, and secretive organizations. Yanked from the comfort of his everyday life, Touya was forced head-long into a world where the threat of death was everywhere and even allies could be his downfall. The wheel of fate has begun to turn. And the story of the Azure, and that of Touya Kagari and the mysterious girl Es, began.

Main characters
 Touya Kagari, in addition to being naturally curious, he also is incredibly kind and compassionate. Despite his calm demeanor, he will charge head long into any fights he sees in order to stop them. Currently lives with the Himezuru family and works part-time at the curry restaurant “Maha Raja”.
 Hinata Himezuru, the younger sister of the Himezuru family, of which Touya is unofficially a member. Incredibly friendly and cheerful, she always looks like she’s enjoying life. She is the de facto head of the household as her older sister Yuki, who is a doctor, is always at work. However, she truly enjoys housework, especially cooking.
 Es, an anti-ability warrior (aka Sleipnir) attached to the Mitsurugi Agency. Outside of combat operations, she is shockingly naive and ignorant about the world around her. She rarely speaks or shows her emotions. In addition to her fighting prowess, she can also detect Discover Calls.
 Kuon Glamred Stroheim, an apprentice at the Academy located on the isle of Ishana. A daughter of the powerful Stroheim family, she has no tolerance for malfeasance and her tendency to white knight frequently gets her in trouble. Her temper is legendary, earning her the nickname “Fire Empress Stroheim”. Due to her potential strength, most believe she will be the first in a long while to earn the right to become a Ten Sage.
 Mei Amanohokosaka, grudgingly works with the Mitsurugi Agency. The scion of the Amanohokosaka clan, she has been hunting Unions since she was a child. As a result, she is far more mature than her peers and often has problems relating to them. She practices a unique form of magic which she uses primarily to obtain information, though she will occasionally use her powers in combat.

Reception

On Metacritic the PlayStation Vita release of the game has a score of 43% based on reviews from 5 critics, indicating "generally unfavorable reviews".

Tom Farndon of Pocket Gamer UK wrote: "If you’re a fan off the BlazBlue series, pick up a copy. If not, then you may want to avoid it unless a visual novel is exactly the experience you’re looking for."

References

External links
 

2013 video games
Arc System Works franchises
Arc System Works games
BlazBlue
PlayStation 3 games
PlayStation Vita games
Video game prequels
Video games developed in Japan
Visual novels
Windows games
Single-player video games